Ryazan, capital of the Principality of Ryazan, was the first Russian city to be besieged by the Mongol invaders under Batu Khan.

Prelude 
In the autumn of 1237 the Mongol Horde led by Batu Khan invaded the Rus' principality of Ryazan. The Prince of Ryazan, Yuriy Igorevich, asked Yuriy Vsevolodovich, the prince of Vladimir, for help, but did not receive any.

Siege 
The Mongols defeated the vanguard of the Ryazan army at the Voronezh River and on December 16, 1237 besieged the capital of the principality (this site is now known as Old Ryazan, Staraya Ryazan, and is situated some 50 km from the modern city of Ryazan). The townspeople repelled the first Mongol attacks. The Mongols then used catapults to destroy the city's fortifications. On December 21, Batu Khan's troops stormed the walls, plundered Ryazan, killed Prince Yuriy and his wife, executed nearly all of the city's inhabitants, and burned the city to the ground. "But God saved the Bishop, for he had departed the same moment when the troops invested the town."

Casualties 
The population of Ryazan in the XIII century is hard to estimate. Archaeological excavations on the site of Old Ryazan in 1915 and 1979 uncovered 97 severed heads on the site of the former church, and 143 bodies in several mass graves, all of whom met violent deaths during the sack of the city.

Aftermath 
The writer of the Rus chronicle described the aftermath of the battle with the words "There was none left to groan and cry". The city of Old Ryazan was completely destroyed and was never rebuilt.

After the destruction of Ryazan, Batu Khan's horde pushed on into the principality of Vladimir-Suzdal.

Notes

References
 Full Collection of Russian Chronicles, St.Petersburg, 1908, reprinted Moscow, 2001, .

Ryazan
Ryazan
Conflicts in 1237
1237 in Europe
History of Ryazan Oblast
13th century in Russia
1237 in the Mongol Empire